The Tour de l'Ouest (English: Tour of the West), also known as the Circuit de I'Ouest, was a road bicycle race held annually from 1911 to 1959 in France.

Winners

References

External links

Cycle races in France
Recurring sporting events established in 1911
1911 establishments in France
Defunct cycling races in France
Super Prestige Pernod races